Oliver Duff (or Davis) Greene (January 25, 1833 – March 19, 1904) was a Union officer who received the Medal of Honor on December 13, 1893 for his action at the Battle of Antietam on September 16, 1862.

Born in Scott, New York, Greene graduated from West Point in 1854, receiving his commission in the artillery. A staff officer for most of his career, he served as Adjutant-General of VI Corps during the Maryland Campaign. A Major at war's end, he was brevetted to brigadier general in March 1865. He received promotions to lieutenant colonel in February 1887, to colonel in July 1892, and retired in January 1897.

Greene was a companion of the California Commandery of the Military Order of the Loyal Legion of the United States.

Medal of Honor citation
"Formed the columns under heavy fire and put them into position."

See also

List of American Civil War Medal of Honor recipients: G–L

References

1833 births
1904 deaths
Union Army officers
United States Army Medal of Honor recipients
United States Military Academy alumni
People of New York (state) in the American Civil War
American Civil War recipients of the Medal of Honor
Burials at San Francisco National Cemetery
People from Scott, New York